Doctor at Sea may refer to:
 Doctor at Sea (novel), 1953 novel by Richard Gordon
Doctor at Sea (film), 1955 British comedy film
Doctor at Sea (TV series), 1974 British TV series